Harry Raymond Zeller (July 10, 1919 – September 22, 2004) was a professional basketball player for the Pittsburgh Ironmen. He attended St. George High School in Allentown, Pennsylvania. He attended college at Washington & Jefferson College.

BAA career statistics

Regular season

References

External links

1919 births
2004 deaths
Basketball players from Pennsylvania
Pittsburgh Ironmen players
Washington & Jefferson Presidents men's basketball players
American men's basketball players
Centers (basketball)
Forwards (basketball)